Joseph Schwartz may refer to:

Joseph Schwartz (composer) (1848-1933), German composer, violinist and music teacher
Joseph Schwartz (architect) (1858–1927), architect of Sioux Falls, South Dakota
Joseph A. Schwarcz, chemistry professor
Joseph M. Schwartz (born 1954), political theorist and left political activist

See also
Edward Joseph Schwartz (1912–2000), United States federal judge